The Best of Bros is the first compilation album by British pop band Bros. The album was released on 1 March 2004 by Columbia Records. The album includes all of the band's singles, along with selected album tracks and B-sides. Nicky Graham and Tom Watkins are credited as the songwriters for the tracks taken from Push, instead of their original credit as "The Brothers".

The album was certified silver by the BPI in March 2019.

Track listing

Note: Although not credited as such, "I Quit" is the remixed single version.

Certification

DVD release
A companion DVD, entitled The Big Picture, was released in March 2005, featuring the music videos for all eleven of the band's singles, along with a live concert that had previously been released on VHS video as Bros Live: The Big Push Tour. It also includes a single discography, documentary and photo gallery. The DVD debuted and peaked at number 42 on the UK Video Charts in the week ending 26 March 2005.

References

2004 compilation albums
2004 video albums
Bros (British band) albums
Music video compilation albums